This is a list of films about bicycles and cycling, featuring notable films where bicycles and cycling play a central role in the development of the plot.

List

See also
List of highest-grossing sports films
List of sports films

References

Cycling films
Cycling
Films